(born 27 September 1975) is a former Japanese rugby union player. Okubo played 23 matches for the Japan national rugby union team from 1999 to 2004. His regular playing positions were Flanker and Lock.

 Okubo is the coach of Top League team Suntory Sungoliath. In 2015, Okubo became the coach of NTT Communications Shining Arcs.

He was named the first Non-Kiwi coach of the Sunwolves in their last year of Super Rugby in 2020.

References

Living people
1975 births
People from Osaka
Sportspeople from Osaka
Japanese rugby union players
Japan international rugby sevens players
Japan international rugby union players
20th-century Japanese people
21st-century Japanese people